Shin-Sakaemachi Station (新栄町駅) is the name of two train stations in Japan:

 Shinsakae-machi Station (Nagoya)
 Shin-Sakaemachi Station (Fukuoka)